In Norse mythology, the Kerlaugar (plural form of Old Norse kerlaug "kettle-bath",) i.e. "bath-tub", are two rivers through which the god Thor wades. The Kerlaugar are attested in the Poetic Edda, compiled in the 13th century from earlier traditional material, and in a citation of the same verse in the Prose Edda, written in the 13th century by Snorri Sturluson.

Attestations
The Kerlaugar are mentioned once in the Poetic Edda. In the Poetic Edda poem Grímnismál, Grímnir notes that the bridge Asbrú "burns all with flames" and that, every day, the god Thor wades through the waters of Körmt and Örmt and the two Kerlaugar:

In the Prose Edda, the rivers are mentioned twice, once in Gylfaginning and once in Skáldskaparmál. In Gylfaginning, High says that Thor wades through rivers to go to court, and then quotes the above cited Grímnismál stanza in support. In Skáldskaparmál, the Kerlaugar appear in the list of rivers in the Nafnaþulur.

Theories and interpretations
Rudolf Simek comments that the meaning is "strange" and may point to an otherwise lost myth about Thor. On the other hand Guðbrandur Vigfússon argued that it and several other river names in the same poem were Irish in origin and related it to river names beginning in Ker- or Char- such as Cherwell. He and Frederick York Powell rendered it "Charlocks" in Corpus Poeticum Boreale.

Thor frequently crosses rivers in the mythology; John Lindow suggests this is due to the large amount of time he spends in the realms of the jötnar, "who live on the other sides of boundaries", and points to a symbolic connection between jötnar and water, citing the ocean-dwelling Jörmungandr as an example.

Notes

References

 Bellows, Henry Adams (1923). The Poetic Edda. American-Scandinavian Foundation.
 Faulkes, Anthony (Trans.) (1995). Edda. Everyman. 
 Gudbrand Vigfusson (Ed.) (1878). Sturlunga Saga: including the Islendinga Saga of Lawman Sturla Thordsson. Volume 1. Clarendon Press.
 Gudbrand Vigfusson, York Powell, F. (Ed. and trans.) (1883). Corpus Poeticum Boreale. Volume 1: Eddic Poetry. Clarendon Press.
 Lindow, John (2001). Norse Mythology: A Guide to the Gods, Heroes, Rituals, and Beliefs. Oxford University Press. 
 Orchard, Andy (1997). Dictionary of Norse Myth and Legend. Cassell. 
 Simek, Rudolf (2007) translated by Angela Hall. Dictionary of Northern Mythology. D.S. Brewer. 
 de Vries, Jan (1970). Altgermanische Religionsgeschichte. Volume 2. 3rd ed. Walter de Gruyter. 
 Thorpe, Benjamin (Trans.) (1907). Edda Sæmundar Hinns Frôða The Edda of Sæmund the Learned. Part I. London Trübner & Co.

Sources
 Sturtevant, Albert Morey (1951). "Etymological Comments on Certain Words and Names in the Elder Edda". PMLA volume 66, no. 2.  JSTOR 459605.

Rivers in Norse mythology
Thor